Syrbula montezuma, known generally as the Montezuma's grasshopper or slant-faced grasshopper, is a species of slant-faced grasshopper in the family Acrididae. It is found in Central America and North America.

References

Further reading

 
 
 
 
 

Acrididae